Georgi Hristov (born 10 January 1985) is a Bulgarian former professional footballer who played as a striker.

Career

Maritsa Plovdiv
Hristov was born in Plovdiv. He grew up as part of Maritsa Plovdiv's academy and made his debut for the senior team in 2002/2003 season. He played for Maritsa until 2007. During the 2005/2006 season he was B PFG's top scorer, with 18 goals. In the same season he was chosen the best footballer of B PFG East group by other players.

Botev Plovdiv
He signed a contract with Botev during summer of 2007. In his first season in A PFG he became a topscorer, scoring 19 goals and was chosen the best footballer of the season by other players. Hristov became a free-agent on 4 July 2008.

Levski Sofia
Hristov started training with Levski Sofia on 23 June 2008. Later, he signed his contract with 'the Blues'. He scored a hat-trick against his ex-team Botev, in one of his first matches for Levski. On 13 August 2008, Hristov earned a penalty for Levski Sofia in the first leg of a decisive Champions League match against BATE Borisov, but it was not converted and the "bluemen" subsequently lost the match by a score of 0:1. On 26 April 2009 Hristov scored four goals against PFC Belasitsa Petrich. He scored in 56th, 63rd, 65th and 86th minute. The result of the match was 1:7 with a guest win for Levski Sofia. On 9 May 2009 Hristov scored the first goal for Levski Sofia in The Eternal Derby against CSKA. The result of the match was 0:2 with a guest win for Levski. He became a Champion of Bulgaria in 2009.

On 15 July 2009, Hristov opened his goal account for the new season with two goals in the first official match for Levski during 2009/2010 season. The event took place in the 2nd Qualifying round of UEFA Champions League, where Levski beaten the team of UE Sant Julià. The result of the match was 4:0 with a home win for Levski. On 5 August 2009, he also scored against FK Baku to wrap up a 2:0 win for the team from Sofia. In the play-off round Levski was eliminated by Debreceni VSC with 4:1 (on aggregate). However, Levski qualified for UEFA Europa League. On 8 January 2009. the coach of Levski Georgi Ivanov, announced that he gave 'his' ex-kit-number 9 to Hristov.

Wisła Kraków
On 26 February 2010 Wisła Kraków signed the Bulgarian forward on loan from PFC Levski Sofia. On 7 June 2010 it was announced that Hristov's loan contract would be terminated and he would return to Levski, unlike the initial plans of Wisła having him on loan until December 2010.

Return to Bulgaria

On 31 August 2010, Hristov moved to PFC Slavia Sofia. In August 2012, he moved to another A PFG outfit PFC Lokomotiv Sofia. In February 2013, he trialed with Major League Soccer club Philadelphia Union.

Tampa Bay Rowdies

On 8 March 2013, The Tampa Bay Rowdies, of the North American Soccer League, announced that the club had signed Hristov to a two-year deal. Year two of the contract is a club option. Hristov scored his first goal for the Rowdies in a 2-0 win against the San Antonio Scorpions. Hristov made 22 appearances during his first season in USA, finishing as the club's top scorer with 12 goals. He also made 8 assists. He won the MVP award of the league that year.

On July 4, 2018 Hristov scored his 58th career goal for the Rowdies, making him the Rowdies’ all-time top scorer.

Since retiring from professional football, Hristov has featured for Nashville United during 2020 U.S. Open Cup qualification, and for South Tampa FC of the Florida Suncoast Soccer League, which is a Tampa Bay-area Sunday league.

International career
Georgi Hristov was called up for one friendly match against Bosnia and Herzegovina in August 2008, but remained an unused substitute.

Personal life
Hristov is an avid rock music fan, and cited the American thrash metal band Metallica as his favourite. His older brother Hristo is a guitarist in the rock band P.I.F.

Statistics 
 (As of 22 May 2018)

Honours

Levski 
 A PFG: 2008–09
 Bulgarian Supercup: 2009

Individual 
B PFG Top Goalscorer: 2005–06
A PFG Top Goalscorer: 2007–08
B PFG "East" Footballer of the Season: 2005–06
A PFG Footballer of the Season: 2007–08
NASL Golden Ball: 2013
NASL Best XI: 2013
NASL Player of the Month - September 2013

References

External links
 
 Tampa Bay Rowdies profile
 Profile at LevskiSofia.info

1985 births
Living people
Bulgarian footballers
Bulgarian expatriate footballers
Association football forwards
First Professional Football League (Bulgaria) players
Second Professional Football League (Bulgaria) players
Israeli Premier League players
Ekstraklasa players
North American Soccer League players
USL Championship players
FC Maritsa Plovdiv players
Botev Plovdiv players
PFC Levski Sofia players
Wisła Kraków players
PFC Slavia Sofia players
F.C. Ashdod players
FC Lokomotiv 1929 Sofia players
Tampa Bay Rowdies players
Expatriate footballers in Poland
Expatriate footballers in Israel
Expatriate soccer players in the United States
Bulgarian expatriate sportspeople in Poland
Footballers from Plovdiv
United Premier Soccer League players